Roanoke Station is an unincorporated community in Jackson Township, Huntington County, Indiana.

Roanoke Station began as a depot outside Roanoke, and thus acquired its name.

Geography

References

Unincorporated communities in Huntington County, Indiana
Unincorporated communities in Indiana